Scott Lee (born March 15, 1949 in Saskatoon, Saskatchewan) is a Canadian sprint canoer who competed in the late 1960s and early 1970s. He was disqualified in the heats of the C-2 1000 m event at the 1968 Summer Olympics in Mexico City. Four years later in Munich, Lee was eliminated in the semifinals of the C-2 1000 m event.

References
Sports-reference.com profile

1949 births
Canadian male canoeists
Canoeists at the 1968 Summer Olympics
Canoeists at the 1972 Summer Olympics
Living people
Olympic canoeists of Canada
Sportspeople from Saskatoon